Ray F. Ferrero Jr. (born January 17, 1934) is an American academic, and was the fifth President of Nova Southeastern University. Ferrero graduated with his bachelor's degree from St. John's University. He received his Juris Doctor from the University of Florida in 1960.  He became the President of Nova Southeastern University in 1998. Ferrero served as the President of the Florida Bar in 1987.

References

External links
 Ferrero's Official Bio
 Walker documented in the History of VHCC
 Info on Ferrero

Living people
Fredric G. Levin College of Law alumni
Presidents of Nova Southeastern University
St. John's University (New York City) alumni
1934 births